Robert Favreau (born July 9, 1948) is a Canadian film director and film editor.
 
His film Les muses orphelines earned him Genie Award and Jutra Award nominations for Best Director. His follow-up feature, Un dimanche à Kigali earned him another Genie Award nomination for Best Director as well as a nomination for Best Motion Picture.

Filmography

Director
Le soleil a pas d'chance - 1975
Corridors - 1980
Pris au piège - 1980
Portion d'éternité - 1988
Nelligan - 1991
L'ombre de l'épervier - 1998, TV series
L'ombre de l'épervier II - 2000, TV series
The Orphan Muses (Les Muses orphelines) - 2000 
Pied-de-biche - 2005
A Sunday in Kigali (Un dimanche à Kigali) - 2006

Editor
Million tout-puissant, Le (1985) 
Pris au piège (1980) 
Corridors (1980) 
Soleil a pas d'chance, Le (1975)

Screenwriter
Nelligan (1991)
A Sunday in Kigali (2006)

External links

1948 births
Living people
Film directors from Montreal
Canadian film editors
French Quebecers
Best Screenplay Genie and Canadian Screen Award winners